Vusal Mahmud oglu Isgandarli (born 3 November 1995) is an Azerbaijani footballer who plays as a midfielder for Sumgayit FK.

Career

Club
On 8 January 2019, Isgandarli signed for Keşla FK from Zira FK.

International
Isgandarli made his international debut for Azerbaijan on 19 November 2019 in a UEFA Euro 2020 qualifying match against Slovakia.

Career statistics

Club

International

References

External links
 
 
 
 

1995 births
Living people
Azerbaijani footballers
Azerbaijan international footballers
Association football midfielders
Ravan Baku FC players
Simurq PIK players
Zira FK players
Shamakhi FK players
Azerbaijan Premier League players

Ankara Keçiörengücü S.K. footballers
TFF First League players
Azerbaijani expatriate sportspeople in Turkey